The UK National Championships in athletics were held between 1977 and 1997, with a one-off event in 2001 to contest a women's steeplechase race. They were a major event in the UK athletics calendar. Unlike the AAA Championships, which were usually open to overseas athletes, the UK championships were only open to competitors from the United Kingdom. In 1980, the event incorporated the British trials for the Olympic Games.

The event was hosted at Scotstoun Stadium in Glasgow

Medal summary

References 
 

UK Athletics Championships
UK
UK
UK
Sports competitions in Glasgow
Athletics competitions in Scotland
2001 in Scottish women's sport